Frank Hansen's Fortune (German: Frank Hansens Glück) is a 1917 German silent Western film directed by Viggo Larsen and starring Larsen, Lupu Pick and Kitty Dewall. Two diggers working in the Mexican diamond fields discover a very valuable diamond leading to a series of events that sees only one of them become rich.

Cast
 Viggo Larsen as Frank Hansen
 Lupu Pick as George Balker
 Kitty Dewall
 Leopold Gadiel
 Viktor Senger

References

Bibliography
 Jung, Uli & Schatzberg, Walter. Beyond Caligari: The Films of Robert Wiene. Berghahn Books, 1999.

External links
 

1917 films
1917 Western (genre) films
Films directed by Viggo Larsen
Films of the German Empire
Films set in Mexico
German black-and-white films
Silent German Western (genre) films
1910s German films